Shawn Stewart Ruff (born July 19, 1959) is an American novelist and editor, who won the Lambda Literary Award for Gay Debut Fiction at the 21st Lambda Literary Awards in 2008 for his debut novel Finlater. He has since published the novels Toss and Whirl and Pass (2010) and GJS II (2016), and the novella One/10th (2013).

He was previously editor of the anthology Go the Way Your Blood Beats: An Anthology of Lesbian and Gay Fiction by African-American Writers (1996), which was a shortlisted nominee for the Lambda Literary Award for Fiction Anthologies at the 9th Lambda Literary Awards in 1997.

A native of Cincinnati, Ohio, he studied English literature at the University of Cincinnati. He is currently based in New York City.

He is also an established beauty, fashion and lifestyle copywriter, having worked for such iconic brands as Chanel, Estee Lauder and Bergdorf Goodman.

Works

Novels
Finlater (Quote Editions, 2008) 
Toss and Whirl and Pass (Quote Editions, 2010) 
ONE/10TH (Quote Editions, 2013) 
GJS II (Quote Editions, 2016)

Anthologies
Go the Way Your Blood Beats: An Anthology of An Anthology of Lesbian and Gay Fiction by African-American Writers (Henry Holt, Owl Books, 1996)

References

External links

1959 births
Living people
21st-century American novelists
American male novelists
African-American novelists
American editors
American gay writers
LGBT African Americans
Writers from Cincinnati
Writers from New York City
University of Cincinnati alumni
Lambda Literary Award for Debut Fiction winners
American LGBT novelists
21st-century American male writers
Novelists from New York (state)
Novelists from Ohio
21st-century African-American writers
20th-century African-American people
African-American male writers